Edward Hayes may refer to:

Edward C. Hayes (1868–1928), American sociologist
Edward A. Hayes (1893–1955), National Commander of the American Legion, 1933–34
Tubby Hayes (Edward Brian Hayes, 1935–1973), British jazz musician
Ned Hayes (1875–1945), Irish hurler

See also
Eddie Hayes (disambiguation)
Edward Hays (disambiguation)
Edward Hay (disambiguation)